Ole Peter Arnulf Øverland (27 April 1889 – 25 March 1968) was a Norwegian poet and artist. He is principally known for his poetry which served to inspire the Norwegian resistance movement during the German occupation of Norway during World War II.

Biography
Øverland was born in Kristiansund and raised in Bergen. His parents were Peter Anton Øverland (1852–1906) and Hanna Hage (1854–1939).
The early death of his father, left the family economically stressed. He was able to attend Bergen Cathedral School and in 1904  Kristiania Cathedral School. He graduated in 1907 and for a time studied philology at University of Kristiania.

Øverland published his first collection of poems (1911). Øverland became a communist sympathizer from the early 1920s and became a member of  Mot Dag. He also served as chairman of the Norwegian Students' Society  1923–28. He changed his stand in 1937, partly as an expression of dissent against the ongoing Moscow Trials. He was an avid opponent of Nazism and in 1936 he wrote the poem "Du må ikke sove" which was printed in the journal Samtiden. ("I thought:: Something is imminent . Our era is over – Europe’s on fire!").

During the German occupation of Norway from 1940 in World War II, he wrote to inspire the Norwegian resistance movement. He wrote a series of poems which were clandestinely distributed, leading to the arrest of both him and his future wife Margrete Aamot Øverland in 1941. Arnulf Øverland was held first in the prison camp of Grini before being transferred to Sachsenhausen concentration camp in Germany. He spent a four-year imprisonment until the liberation of Norway in 1945. His poems were later collected in Vi overlever alt  and published in 1945.

Øverland played an important role in the Norwegian language struggle in the post-war era. He became a noted supporter for the conservative written form of Norwegian called Riksmål, he was president of Riksmålsforbundet (an organization in support of Riksmål) from 1947 to 1956. In addition, Øverland adhered to the traditionalist style of writing, criticising modernist poetry on several occasions. His speech Tungetale fra parnasset, published in Arbeiderbladet in 1954, initiated the so-called Glossolalia debate.

Personal life
In 1918, he married the singer Hildur Arntzen (1888–1957). Their marriage was dissolved in 1939. In 1940, he married Bartholine Eufemia Leganger (1903–1995). They separated shortly after, and were officially divorced in 1945. Øverland was married to journalist Margrete Aamot Øverland (1913–1978) during June 1945.
In 1946, the Norwegian Parliament arranged for Arnulf and Margrete Aamot Øverland to reside at the Grotten. He lived there until his death in 1968 and she lived there for another ten years until her death in 1978.

Arnulf Øverland was buried at Vår Frelsers Gravlund in Oslo. Joseph Grimeland designed the bust of Arnulf Øverland  (bronze, 1970)
at his grave site.

Famous quotes 

 “For a “monotheistic” religion it should be sufficient with three gods.”
 “What is there to be said about a Church which certainly promises its believers eternal salvation, but at the same time condemns the non-believers, all those who think differently, to an eternal torment in hell? – If that Church absolutely must talk about love, then it should do so very quietly.”

Selected works
 Den ensomme fest (1911)
 Berget det blå (1927)
 En Hustavle (1929)
 Den røde front (1937)
 Vi overlever alt (1945)
 Sverdet bak døren (1956)
 Livets minutter (1965)

Awards
 Gyldendal's Endowment (1935)
 Dobloug Prize (1951)
 Mads Wiel Nygaards legat (1961)

References

Other sources

Hambro, Carl (1984) Arnulf Øverland : det brennende hjerte   (Oslo: Aschehoug)

External links
 "Du må ikke sove!" 
 Translation of "Du må ikke sove" by Lars-Toralf Storstrand
 Kristendommen, den tiende landeplage 
 Christianity, the tenth plague

1889 births
1968 deaths
People from Kristiansund
Atheism activists
Grini concentration camp survivors
Members of the Norwegian Academy
People educated at the Bergen Cathedral School
Mot Dag
20th-century Norwegian poets
Norwegian male poets
Norwegian essayists
Norwegian resistance members
People prosecuted for blasphemy
Riksmål-language writers
Sachsenhausen concentration camp survivors
Dobloug Prize winners
Norwegian communists
Male essayists
20th-century essayists
20th-century atheists
Burials at the Cemetery of Our Saviour